is a town located in Shimomashiki District, Kumamoto Prefecture, Japan. From Kumamoto City, Misato is about 30 minutes by car or an hour and a half by bus. While it is easily accessible by car or bus, there is currently no train service to the town.

The town was formed on November 1, 2004 from the merger of the towns of Chūō and Tomochi.

As of March 2017, the estimated population is 10,532. The total area is 144.03 km².

Culture and Events

The town of Misato has many small town features and local festivals. Every November there is a festival in which challengers attempt to climb the steps within a certain amount of time.

References

External links

Misato official website 

Towns in Kumamoto Prefecture